Şəkər or Shekher may refer to:
Şəkər, Goychay, Azerbaijan
Şəkər, Khojavend, Azerbaijan

See also
Sheker